Pittsburg, North Carolina is a town in Scotch Irish Township, Rowan County, North Carolina. It was named for the industrial heritage of Pittsburgh, Pennsylvania. It was first noted in an 1882 map of North Carolina by W.C. Kerr. Moore's Chapel African Methodist Episcopal Zion Church is located in Pittsburg.

References 

Geography of Rowan County, North Carolina